A Mandela Rhodes Scholarship provides full funding for up to a maximum of two years of postgraduate study for an African citizen under 30 years of age. The award is open to all African citizens under the age of 30 years and recipients must study towards Honours or master's degrees at recognised South African institutions. Although no maximum number of awards has been stipulated, the scholarships are highly competitive, with fewer than 30 scholarships being awarded each year since its inception in 2005. The scholarships cover tuition, accommodation, meals, book allowance, general allowance, and travel expenses. Recipients of the Mandela Rhodes Scholarship are students with outstanding academic achievements who also possess leadership ability, entrepreneurial skills, and a commitment to reconciliation. In addition to receiving funding for their studies, scholars also undertake a leadership development program while in residence. The award is named after Nelson Mandela and Cecil Rhodes and is administered by the Mandela Rhodes Foundation which is a partnership between Nelson Mandela and the Rhodes Trust.

References

External links 
 
 Official website of the Mandela Rhodes Community (alumni network)

Nelson Mandela
Scholarships
Rhodes House